Lake Kuwakatai is a small dune lake located on the south head of Kaipara Harbour in New Zealand.

References

Kuwakatai
Rodney Local Board Area